The López-Cobos International Opera Conductors Competition, pioneer in this speciality, is held in the Teatro Real, Madrid every two years since 2006. The conductors conduct the Madrid Symphony Orchestra, whose members compose the jury. The first prize implies a two-year contract as Assistant Conductor in the theater.

The second edition grand winner, Eun Sun Kim, will be the first woman to conduct in the Teatro Real.

References

External links
 El Mundo 

Conducting competitions